The 1929 Paris–Tours was the 24th edition of the Paris–Tours cycle race and was held on 5 May 1929. The race started in Paris and finished in Tours. The race was won by Nicolas Frantz.

General classification

References

1929 in French sport
1929
May 1929 sports events